This list of synagogues in Serbia contains active, otherwise used and destroyed synagogues in Serbia. The list of Serbian synagogues is not necessarily complete, as only a negligible number of sources testify to the existence of some synagogues.

The capital city: Belgrade

Autonomous Province of Vojvodina

North Bačka District

North Banat District

South Bačka District

South Banat District

West Bačka District

Central Banat District

Srem District

Central Serbia

Belgrade District

Nišava District

Podunavlje District

Šumadija District

Zaječar District

Sources 
 http://judaica.cz/?page_id=2792

Serbia
Serbia
Synagogues